Nikita Glushkov may refer to:

 Nikita Glushkov (footballer, born 1992), Russian football player
 Nikita Glushkov (footballer, born 1994), Russian football player
 Nikita Glushkov (footballer, born 1999), Russian football player